Catherine Osborne may refer to:

Catherine Osborne, Duchess of Leeds (1764–1837), second wife of Francis Osborne, 5th Duke of Leeds 
Catherine Isabella Osborne (1818–1880), Irish artist, writer and patron
Catherine Rowett, who published as Catherine Osborne from 1979 to 2011, professor of philosophy